This is a list of Brazilian television related events from 1970.

Events
21 June - Brazil beat Italy 4-1 to win the 1970 World Cup at Mexico City, Mexico.

Debuts

Television shows

Births
19 May - Daniel Boaventura, actor & singer

Deaths

See also
1970 in Brazil
List of Brazilian films of 1970